Chumacero is a surname. Notable people with the surname include:

Alejandro Chumacero (born 1991), Bolivian international football player
Alí Chumacero (1918–2010), Mexican poet
Blas Chumacero (1905–1997), Mexican trade union leader and interim secretary general of the Confederation of Mexican Workers
Edgar Chumacero (born 1980), Mexican fencer

See also
Francisco Villagutiérrez Chumacero (1587–1652), Roman Catholic prelate who served as Auxiliary Bishop of Toledo (1646–1652)